Masha is a 2004 Russian comedy-drama film directed by Sergey Tkachev.

Plot 
Muscovite Masha goes to Paris to her father, who saw her only in early childhood. His girlfriend Natasha helps them better understand each other and he is forced to rethink his life.

Cast 
 Mariya Shalayeva as Masha (as Masha Shalayeva)
 Dmitry Shevchenko as Dima
 Nataliya Tkachyova as Natasha

References

External links 
 

2004 films
2000s Russian-language films
Russian comedy-drama films
2004 comedy-drama films